Richard Weil (born 6 February 1988) is a German professional footballer who plays as a central midfielder for VfB Stuttgart II in the Regionalliga Südwest.

Career
On 3 June 2019, Weil joined Kickers Offenbach on a two-year contract.

References

External links
 
 

1988 births
Living people
Association football midfielders
German footballers
Eintracht Frankfurt II players
1. FC Heidenheim players
1. FSV Mainz 05 II players
Würzburger Kickers players
1. FC Magdeburg players
Kickers Offenbach players
VfB Stuttgart II players
2. Bundesliga players
3. Liga players
Footballers from Frankfurt